Harry Paton may refer to:

Harry Paton (rugby union) (1881–1964), New Zealand rugby union player
Harry Paton (soccer) (born 1998), Canadian soccer player

See also
Harry Patton (1884–1930), American baseball player